Liberal Party was a political party in Thailand, active during the 1980s.

History 

The Liberal Party was founded by Seraneeporm Komlas on 16 September 1982 After Seraneeporm Komlas resigned the office of the party leader on 27 July 1986, Narong Kittikachorn son of Thanom Kittikachorn and son-in-law of former military dictator Praphas Charusathien became leader of the party. The party did not field any candidates for the March 1992 Thai general election and was dissolved on 8 January 1993.

General election results

References 

Defunct political parties in Thailand
1982 establishments in Thailand
Political parties established in 1982
Political parties disestablished in 1993